Seiwa Dam  is an earthfill dam located in Hokkaido Prefecture in Japan. The dam is used for irrigation. The catchment area of the dam is 5.7 km2. The dam impounds about 25  ha of land when full and can store 1162 thousand cubic meters of water. The construction of the dam was started on 1924 and completed in 1926.

References

Dams in Hokkaido